The Mesoproterozoic Dripping Spring Quartzite is a resistant, purple quartzite formation found in central and southeast Arizona, USA. It is a cliff-forming purplish unit found in the lower sections of the Apache Group, units of originally sedimentary layers, but later metamorphosed. The Apache Group is coeval with a similar aged Proterozoic sequence of eight geologic units found in the lowest geologic sequences of the Grand Canyon, the Grand Canyon Supergroup.

The Apache Group, or some underlying Vishnu Basement Rocks (Ruin Granite), are prominently found in all of the Sierra Ancha range, the range being separated by faults from its neighboring Mazatzal Mountains west, and the Salt River to the south. The Apache Group extends to regions east of the Sierra Ancha, and also regionally to Globe just south-southeast, and the neighboring Dripping Spring Mountains, again just south of the Globe region.

The Apache Group in descending order from youngest to oldest geologic units:

D-Troy Quartzite
C-Mescal Limestone
B-Dripping Spring Quartzite
 Barnes Conglomerate (Globe, Arizona region, lowest of Dripping Spring Q.)
A-Pioneer Shale
 Scanlon Conglomerate (lowest of Pioneer Shale)

References

Lucchitta, 2001. Hiking Arizona's Geology, Ivo Lucchitta, c 2001, Mountaineers's Books, Hike 18, Aztec Peak Trail-(Sierra Ancha), pp. 145–149 and Jug Trail to Jerome Creek-(Sierra Ancha), pp. 170–174 (softcover)

Mesoproterozoic geology
Precambrian United States
Geologic formations of Arizona
Quartzite formations
Arizona transition zone mountain ranges